The Lead Singer and Dancer and His Woman is a 2015 Chinese romantic drama film directed by Niu Jianrong. It was released on January 9.

Cast
Chu Shuanzhong
Ding Liuyuan
Peng Jing

Reception
By January 10, 2015, the film had earned ¥30,000 at the Chinese box office.

References

2015 romantic drama films
Chinese romantic drama films
2010s Mandarin-language films